This article is about the Demographic history of Bosnia and Herzegovina, and deals with the country's documented demographics over time. For an overview of the various ethnic groups and their historical development, see Ethnic groups in Bosnia and Herzegovina.

Overview

Prehistoric 
The highest concentration of Haplogroup I-M170, the only native European Haplogroup, is found in present-day Bosnia and Herzegovina, ranging from 65% to 73%. The oldest traces of mankind in Bosnia and Herzegovina were during the Paleolithic period near Doboj, Prnjavor and in the Valley of the River of Usora. During the Neolithic period there were three cultural zones: the Adriatic in Herzegovina; the Pannonian-Balkan in Bosnia and the transitional zone between the two in the headwaters of the river of Bosnia. Bosnia and Herzegovina has many archaeological foundings from the Bronze to Iron Age. Throughout the Classical Age cultural and civilization layers of the Illyrians (Daorsi in eastern Herzegovina, Ardiaei, Sardeates, Japodi, Breuci, Autariatae, Dalmatae  etc.), Celts (Scordisci), Thracians, Romans, Huns, Germanic peoples (Visigoths, Ostrogoths) and others were formed, though the majority of the populace was Romanized during the conquests at the beginning of the New Era. The Eastern Goths thrust into the area during the early Middle Ages, while Avars and Slavs came in the 6th century.

Medieval 
Due to a variety of factors (such as frequent boundary shifts and a relative isolation from the rest of Europe) there are no detailed statistics dealing with Bosnia's population during the Middle Ages. It is generally estimated that the population of the Kingdom of Bosnia at the height of its power was between 500,000 and 1,000,000 people. There were very few significant urban centers in Bosnia at this time, and even these paled in comparison to the far more urbanized areas along the nearby Dalmatian coast. Among the more notable cities were Doboj, Jajce, Srebrenik, Srebrenica, Tešanj and Visoko. The overwhelming majority of the population was rural and the social organization of Medieval Bosnia developed into what was called Zadruga. In this system, communities were organized by a few families of common interests usually situated in a cluster housing formation. Leaders of the community were selected according to their age and high ethical standards. Zadruga was primarily an agrarian community greatly dependent on natural resources.

In the late 15th century, there was at least 35,000 Vlach homes in the area of Herzegovina.

Migrations and other 

Throughout the 15th–19th centuries there were many demographic changes.  Frequent wars, religious persecutions, rebellions, uprisings, taking of children as tribute, high tributes, high taxes, years of bad crops, epidemics, violence, and oppression have caused a high mortality rate and suffering of the whole population and instigated the migration flows that changed the ethnic structure of the population. So, with arrival of Ottoman Empire coincided with the process of Christian population emigration from these regions, which has remained the main feature of the demographic development of the population of Bosnia and Herzegovina until the present day. At the same time, intense internal shifting of the population together with recurrent migrations and also immigrations changed the distribution of some ethnic groups in Bosnia and Herzegovina in the Ottoman period. The later stages saw particularly Muslim migrations from the region.

In the Bosnia proper the population started to move out first from lower regions (Posavina and the river valleys) and then from highlands. The most intensive migration flows originated in the karst Dinaric regions of Herzegovina and western Bosnia. For centuries, the population from these regions, mostly Christian, headed towards surrounding countries):
 The migrations from Western Bosnia (from Glamoč and Unac, Kupres, Grahovo) were heading towards Lika, Croatia proper, and Slovenia, and steady emigration flows from Bosnia and Herzegovina, Dalmatia, and Lika headed towards Slavonia, Syrmia, Banat, Bačka, and Baranja.
 Migrations from eastern Herzegovina and Upper Podrinje headed towards western Serbia and Šumadija.
 Migrations from the southern Dinaric region of Bosnia and Herzegovina headed towards Dalmatia. Jovan Cvijić states that the first migrations to Dalmatia from the Dinaric hinterland started already at the end of the 12th century, and they became stronger in the Ottoman period from the 15th to the 18th century. Also these migrations shifted the medieval population of Dalmatia that had previously migrated mostly towards Croatia, Slavonija, and Italy. According to Cvijić, almost all of the population of Makarska, Omiš, Split, Šibenik and Bukovica originated from Bosnia and Herzegovina.
 Of the Herzegovina origin were the inhabitants of the city of Dubrovnik and the vicinity, while the population of the Bay of Kotor originated from the Montenegrin and Herzegovina Dinaric regions.

Throughout the 15th–19th centuries, with coming of the Ottoman Empire on the territory of Bosnia and Herzegovina the first significant demographic change took place as almost all followers of than Bosnian Church converted to Islam as a method of keeping the ownership of the land they owned before the Ottoman conquest. Their conversions were also of a political nature; while Eastern Orthodox and Catholic portions of the Bosnian population had their base in the Serbian Orthodox Church and Catholic Church, Bosnian church followers had no representation on a larger geopolitical scene. Added motivation were also tax reliefs for conversions to Islam.
There was also a great influx of Eastern Orthodox believers, due to the constant immigrations from Montenegro and Serbia, frequent wars (Eastern Orthodox population participated as soldiers on both sides), and shortage of Catholic preachers.

Preottoman Catholic population had a great share in the emigrations from Bosnia and Herzegovina. The emigration flows were directed towards Dalmatia, Croatia, Slavonia, Baranja and north-west Bačka. The western part of today's region of Bosnia, today known as Bosnian Krajina, was taken by the Ottomans in the 16th century, and was for some time still known as "Turkish Croatia", as its once overwhelming Catholic and Croat majority disappeared and the Ottomans entrenched the new border along the Sava and Una rivers. After more than a century of military losses, the Habsburg Empire waged some victorious wars against Turkey and managed to temporarily shift the border south of the Sava river with the Treaty of Passarowitz (1718), but this was undone as soon as the 1739 Treaty of Belgrade was signed. Austria-Hungary would later take hold of the entire territory of Bosnia and Herzegovina after the Treaty of Berlin (1878), but under different circumstances, leading up to the Bosnian crisis of 1908. Relatively few previous Croatian emigrants came back to Bosnia.

According to the findings of many an author, the Muslim population, in the period of the Ottoman rule, did not emigrate much compared to the migrations of the Eastern Orthodox and Catholic population. The Muslim population was characteristic of return migrations as soon as the political and economic situation again became stable or the state borders were shifted. The return movements of the Muslim population from the seaside, Lika, Slavonia, Hungary, and other places are well known. For example, after the Siege of Vienna (1683–1699), territorial losses of the Ottoman Empire and the conquest of Lika and Krbava by the Austrian Imperial Army, mass movements of the Muslim population from those regions took place; the Muslim population headed towards Bihać, Cazin, and Bosanska Krupa where they created an enclave in the vast region of Bosnian Frontier. More intensified immigrations of the Muslim population were noticed in 1690 when they moved from Hungary and Slavonia to the region around the mountain of Majevica.

In the Ottoman period, the Muslim population increased in number in Bosnia and Herzegovina somewhat due to immigrations of Muslims from the Sanjaks of Smederevo and Novi Pazar, and especially from some regions of Montenegro, Sjenica, and Pešter. Immigrations of the Turkish population from Asia Minor also had an impact upon the growth of the Muslim population in Bosnia and Herzegovina from the 15th to 19th century.

However, the increase of the Muslim population was mostly due to their high natality rate given the patriarchal nature of the family structure. In such family structure the duties of the family members were strictly divided where female members of the family almost solely were bearing many children and taking care of the household while male members were engaged in running the land and the politics of the community.

Patriarchal structure was also evident in Eastern Orthodox and Catholic families but the statistics do not tend to show as high natality rates. The difference (according to some literary sources of the time) was in the social levels of Muslims relative to their Christian counterparts where the former were landowners and hence upper and upper middle class who could afford to have more offspring and the latter were land workers and hence lower middle to lower class. Such social organization corresponded to a feudal system of the time.

Ottoman Empire 
During and shortly after the Ottoman conquest of Bosnia, between 1463 and 1557, it is estimated that the Ottoman forces took around 100,000 of Bosnia's inhabitants into captivity and 30,000 young into the Janissaries as a result of the devshirmeh.

The first official population census by religion in Bosnia conducted:

In 1489, the official population census by religion for Bosnian Sanjak was:

Contemporary Byzantine historian Michael Critobulus of Imbros described Bosnia and its endings in the first half of the 15th century. He calls Bosnia "land of Vostri" and its population Vostri (or Bostri, Bostni), clearly distinguishing Bosnia population from populations of its neighbors, which Serbian scholar Radivoj Radić cites and explains in his study Bosnia in historical work of Critobulus of Imbros, citing author who calls Bosnians by the name of "Vostri", Albanians by the name of "Illirians", and Serbs by the name of "Tribali".

Turkish historian Ömer Lütfü Barkan conducted a population census based on religion in the Sanjak of Bosnia between 1520 and 1530. At that time, there were over 334,325 inhabitants, of whom 38,7% were followers of Islam.

During the late 16th century and early 17th century, according to various Austria-Hungary and Ottoman sources, Bosnia Eyalet's entire nobility, the greater part of her citizenry and a part of the serfdom were Muslims, around 75% of the population, and the Apostolic visitor Peter Masarechi claimed in his 1624 report that the population of Bosnia (excluding Herzegovina) was 450,000 Muslims, 150,000 Catholics, and 75,000 Orthodox.

The Muslim population of Bosnia and Herzegovina, during the late 18th century to the early 19th century, started to gradually drop due to frequent wars fought by the Ottoman Empire. Muslims were required by Ottoman law to serve in the military, whereas Christians were not part of the army. With the created of independent states of Serbia and Montenegro, migrations of Serbs to the two states were in massive waves in the 1810s, 1820s and 1870s.

Both Muslim and Christian populations were considerably thinned in the 18th century due to frequent plagues. In particular, a huge plague epidemic reportedly halved the entire population of Bosnia and Herzegovina between 1813 and 1815.

It is impossible to give a correct estimate of the population of Bosnia at the time. Some writers state it a million, others at 920,000 and 840,000. Leopold von Zedlitz-Neukirch , in his "Blicke auf Bosnien, Rascien, die Herzegewina und Servien, bei der Fortsetzung des Russisch-Türkischen Krieges im Jahre 1829", gives us in one portion of his work the following estimates: 
 Bosniaks – 250,000
 Serbians – 120,000
 Turks – 240,000
 Morlachs – 75,000
 Croats – 40,000
 Gypsies – 16,000
 Jews – 2,000
 Armenians – 800

Making a total of 743,800.
 450,000 Muslims
 250,000 Catholics
 220,000 Eastern Orthodox
 2,000 Jews
 800 Armenians

Johann Roskiewicz estimated the ethnic composition of the population in 1867 as:
 In Bosnia:
 782,000 Slavs
 9,000 Roma
 5,000 Jews
 In Herzegovina:
 227,000 Slavs
 2,500 Roma
 500 Jews

In the 1871 population census done by the Ottoman Empire in the Bosnia Vilayet, the census says:

Between 1875 and 1876, an Ottoman population census by religion was conducted, but with vague, imprecise and varying figures:

New empire created mostly Muslim elites which made up the majority in most of the cities, as in the westernmost and easternmost of Bosnia (Cazin area, parts of Drina valley and larger area around Tuzla). Number of Catholic dropped in northern Bosnia (except for large parts of Bosnian Posavina), in central Bosnia Catholics dropped roughly to about one half of the population, and in Herzegovina Catholic and Orthodox were majority west and east of the Neretva, with a Muslim majority in most of the settlements.

Territorial distribution 
The Muslim population was mostly urban and comprised the majority in most of Bosnia and Herzegovina towns (Sarajevo, Tuzla, Banja Luka) as in western (Cazin and along the Una valley (Pounje)) and eastern (along the Drina valley) border areas of the country. In general, Muslims were the dominant group in most developed urban centers of the country. 
Parts of Bosanska Krajina with parts of Western Bosnia, parts of Eastern Herzegovina and across the Drina river toward Serbia border had Eastern Orthodox majority. These are mostly mountainous regions. The re-establishment of the Serbian Patriarchate of Peć in 1557, shortage of catholic priesthood, and general Ottoman tolerance, especially for Orthodox Christianity, contributed greatly to enlargement and maintenance of Orthodox population, later Serbs in these areas.

The Catholic population comprised majority in parts of the Herzegovina, Posavina and Central Bosnia. Franciscan Order played major role in maintaining Catholic population, in face of periodical emigration.

Due to the frequent migrations and wars, population in many areas of the country was mixed, containing people of different religions.

Bosnia accepted a wave of immigrants of Jews that were expelled from Spain since the 15th century. They settled in Sarajevo, Travnik, Banja Luka and Bihać. The immigration of the Roma, Vlachs and Cincars, and Circassians, in small numbers, coincided with the Ottoman conquest of Bosnia and Herzegovina. None of these groups considerably influenced the overall population structure of the country.

During the popular uprisings between 1875 and 1878, Bosnia and Herzegovina lost 13,64% of its population (150,000 out of total 1,100,000).

Austro-Hungarian Empire

1879 census 
The Austro-Hungarian government published the Haupt-Uebersicht der politischen Eintheilung von Bosnien und der Hercegovina, with demographics according to the census collected on 16 June 1879. The first thorough population census, it recorded 1,158,440 citizens of Bosnia and Herzegovina, by religion:

1885 census 
The Austro-Hungarian government published the Ortschafts-Bevölkerungs-Statistik von Bosnien und der Hercegovina nach dem Volkszählungs-Ergebnisse vom I. Mai 1885.. According to the 1885 population census there were 1,336,091 citizens of Bosnia and Herzegovina, by religion:

1895 census 

An Austro-Hungarian population census conducted in Bosnia and Herzegovina on 22 April 1895 which reported that the area of Bosnia had approximately 1,361,868 inhabitants while Herzegovina had 229,168 inhabitants. The Catholic Encyclopedia treated the majority Slavic population (98%) as Serbs.

The number of persons per square mile was the second lowest in Austro-Hungary: 80 inhabitants per square mile. The number of persons per square mile across districts:

There were 5,388 settlements, 11 of which had more than 5,000 inhabitants.  Over 4,689 of those settlements contained less than 500 inhabitants.

The population census by religion:

The territorial distribution among the area didn't change much. The towns became more multiethnic.

Turkish merchants could be found in trading centres. The Austrian troops could be found in military garrisons, while the Jews that migrated from Spain earlier could be found in the cities. They were all divided according to occupation, 1,385,291 inhabitants (85%) were farmers or wine-cultivators. There were a total of 5,833 large estates, chiefly held by the Muslims. 88,970 cultivators serve as kmets.  88,867 free peasants own the land they till. 22,625 peasants own farming-land and also cultivate the land of others

1910 census 

According to the 1910 population census there were 1,898,044 citizens of Bosnia and Herzegovina:

The urban population was, according to religion, 50.76% Muslims, 24.49% Roman Catholics, and 19.92% Eastern Orthodox. Land ownership was 91.1% Muslims, 6% Eastern Orthodox, 2.6% Roman Catholics, and 0.3% others. Comparing the 1910 percentages with the 1879 census shows a drop of the Muslim percentage from 39% to 32%, and a rise in Catholics from 18% to 23%, while the Orthodox population hovered around 43% the entire time.

World War I 
The First World War left Bosnia and Herzegovina without a total figure of 360,000 citizens or 19% of its population.

Migrations 
As soon as the State of Slovenes, Croats and Serbs was formed, a number of earlier colonized families started to emigrate and return to their homelands, among them Germans, Czechs, Poles, Slovaks, Hungarians and Ruthenians.

The new planned resettlement plans hit most the Orthodox Serb population, as large masses were moved from passive regions of Herzegovina and Bosnia to Vojvodina, eastern Banat to be precise; while some left to Kosovo: inhabiting the region from Kačanik to Vučitrn, around Pristina, Lipljan, Peć, Istok, Đakovica, and in Drenica. Some also left to Macedonia.

The earlier emigrational tendency of the Muslim population towards Ottoman-held territories continued.

A great number of the population, among whom the Serbs and Croats from the karst regions of Herzegovina and Western Bosnia were most numerous, moved to the northern regions of Yugoslavia and abroad (North and South America, Canada, France, Belgium, etc.)

Kingdom of Yugoslavia

Territorial distribution 

Following the agrarian reforms of 1918 and 1919, the government confiscated the property of Muslim landowners and redistributed it to non-Muslims.

1921 census 
The Kingdom of Serbs, Croats and Slovenes conducted a population census in the territorial entity of Bosnia and Herzegovina on 31 January 1921. There were 1,890,440 persons in Bosnia and Herzegovina. The people were split among two nationalities:
 Serbs and Croats
 undecided and others (mostly Muslims)

By religion:
 Serbian Orthodox Christians 829,290 (43.87%)
 Sunni Muslims 588,244 (31.07%)
 Catholic Christians 444,308 (23.58%)
 others 28,595 (1.58%)

Sarajevo 
The population of the district of Sarajevo according to the 1921 Kingdom of Serbs, Croats and Slovenes religious population census:
 Serbian Orthodox Christians 55,477 (38.6%%)
 Sunni Muslims 50,270 (34.9%)
 Croats 29,395 (20.4%)
 others 8,768 (6.1%)

There were 8 municipalities and their populations were:
 Serbs comprised the majority in 5 municipalities: Ilidža, Koševo, Pale, Rajlovac, and Trnovo
 Muslims comprised the majority in the City of Sarajevo and in 2 municipalities: Bjelašnica and Ozren

The same year the City of Sarajevo had 78,173 inhabitants:
 Sunni Muslims 29,649 (37.9%)
 Catholics 21,373 (27.3%)
 Serbian Orthodox Christians 18,630 (23.8%)
 others 8,522 (11.0%)

1931 census 

The Kingdom of Yugoslavia has conducted a population census on the territory of Bosnia and Herzegovina on 31 March 1931 which stated that there were 2,323,555 persons. The population was given several nationalities:
 Yugoslavs
 Germans
 Ukrainians
 Poles
 Hungarians
 Roma
 Turks

By religion:

World War II

Losses 
The Federal Bureau of Statistics in Belgrade composed a figure of 179,173 persons killed in the war in Bosnia and Herzegovina during the Second World War:
 129,114 Serbs (72.1%)
 29,539 Muslims (16.5%)
 7,850 Croats (4.4%)
 others (7%)

Expulsions and relocations 
By the plans of Nazi Germany and the Independent State of Croatia 110,000 Serbs were relocated and transported to German-occupied Serbia. Just in the period of May to August 1941 over 100,000 Serbs were expelled to Serbia. In the heat of war Serbia had 200,000–400,000 Serbian refugees from Ustaša-held Bosnia and Herzegovina. By the end of war 137,000 Serbs have permanently left the territories of Bosnia and Herzegovina.

The Muslim population was also exposed to suffering and intense relocation, mainly to cities and mostly to Sarajevo, to where a portion of the Muslim population from Serbia, Montenegro, Kosovo, and Macedonia was relocated thus enlarging the overall Muslim percentage in Bosnia and Herzegovina.

Socialist Yugoslavia

1945–1948 colonization of Vojvodina 
Prior to the expulsions of Germans from Vojvodina in 1945–1948, a number of inhabitants of Bosnia and Herzegovina moved to the new living spaces in Vojvodina:
 Serbs around 70,000 (98%)
 Croats and Muslims (around 2%)

1948 census 
According to the 1948 People's Federal Republic of Yugoslavia population census, the People's Republic of Bosnia and Herzegovina had 2,565,277 inhabitants:
 Serbs 1,136,116 (44.3%)
 undecided 788,403 (30.7%)
 Croats 614,123 (23.9%)
 Slovenes 4,338 (0.2%)
 Montenegrins 3,094 (0.1%)
 Macedonians 675
 others 18,528 (0.8%)

1953 census 
According to the 1953 Yugoslav population census, Bosnia and Herzegovina had 2,847,790 inhabitants:
 Serbs 1,264,372 (44.4%)
 undecided 891,800 (31.3%)
 Croats 654,229 (23%)
 Montenegrins 7,336 (0.3%)
 Slovenes 6,300 (0.2%)
 Macedonians 1,884 (0.1%)
 others 21,869 (0.7%)

1961 census 
According to the 1961 Socialist Federal Republic of Yugoslavia population census, the Socialist Republic of Bosnia and Herzegovina had 3,277,948 inhabitants:
 Serbs 1,406,057 (42.9%)
 Muslims (later Bosniaks carried the name Muslims) 842,248 (25.7%)
 Croats 711,665 (21.7%)
 Yugoslavs 275,883 (8.4%)
 Montenegrins 12,828 (0.4%)
 Rusyns 6,136 (0.2%)
 Slovenes 5,939 (0.2%)
 Albanians 3,642 (0.1%)
 Macedonians 2,391 (0.1%)
 Turks 1,812 (0.1%)
 Hungarians 1,415 (0.1%)
 others 6,849 (0.2%)

Ethnic maps of Sarajevo and Brcko by settlements:

1971 census 
According to the 1971 Socialist Federal Republic of Yugoslavia population census, the Socialist Republic of Bosnia and Herzegovina had 3,746,111 inhabitants:
 Muslims (later Bosniaks carried the name Muslims) 1,482,430 (39.6%)
 Serbs 1,393,148 (37.2%)
 Croats 772,491 (20.6%)
 Yugoslavs 43,796 (1.2%)
 Montenegrins 13,021 (0.3%)
 Ukrainians 5,332 (0.2%)
 Slovenes 4,053 (0.2%)
 Albanians 3,764 (0.1%)
 Macedonians 1,773 (0.0%)
 Roma 1,456 (0.0%)
 Hungarians 1,262 (0.0%)
 others 23,584 (0,8%)

Ethnic maps of Sarajevo and Brcko by settlements:

1981 census 
According to the 1981 Socialist Federal Republic of Yugoslavia population census, the Socialist Republic of Bosnia and Herzegovina had 4,124.008 inhabitants:
 Muslims (later Bosniaks carried the name Muslims) 1,629,924 (39.5%)
 Serbs 1,320,644 (32%)
 Croats 758,136 (18.4%)
 Yugoslavs 326,280 (7.9%)
 Montenegrins 14,114 (0.3%)
 Roma 7,251 (0.2%)
 Ukrainians 4,502 (0.1%)
 Albanians 4,396 (0.1%)
 Slovenes 2,755 (0.1%)
 Macedonians 1,892 (0.1%)
 others 54,119 (1.4%)
During the time of Socialist Federal Republic of Yugoslavia, percentage of Croats in Bosnia and Herzegovina fell by more than a quarter.

Ethnic maps of Sarajevo and Brcko by settlements:

The 1981 territorial population distribution in the Socialist Republic of Bosnia and Herzegovina:
 Serbs:
 majority in 2,439 settlements or 41.4% of the total settlements
 lived in 34.3% of the total housing
 Muslims
 majority in 2,179 settlements or 37%of the total settlements
 lived in 37.6% of the total housing
 Croats
 majority in 1,016 settlements or 17.3% of the total settlements
 lived in 17.3% of the total housing
 mixed and rest
 223 settlements

During the time of Socialist Federal Republic of Yugoslavia, slight fall in population percentage and settlements of Croats in Bosnia and Herzegovina was due to immigration in foreign countries of western Europe, while Serbs colonized Vojvodina, Bosniaks stayed in Bosnia. Also as the data shows, Serbian people were less urbanized than Bosniaks or Croats and preferred smaller settlements (31% percent of populations lived in 41% of settlements).

1991 census 
Yugoslav population census, Bosnia and Herzegovina had 4,377,053 inhabitants:
 ethnic Muslims 1,902,956 (43.47%)
 Serbs 1,366,104 (31.21%)
 Croats 760,872 (17.38%)
 Yugoslavs 242,682 (5.54%)
 others 104,439 (2.40%):
 Montenegrins – 10,071
 Roma – 8,864
 Albanians – 4,922
 Ukrainians – 3,929
 Slovenes – 2,190
 Macedonians – 1,596
 Hungarians – 893
 Italians – 732
 Czechs – 590
 Poles – 526
 Germans – 470
 Jews – 426
 Russians – 297
 Slovaks – 297
 Turks – 267
 Romanians – 162
 Ruthenians – 133
 Other nationalities – 17,592
 Undefined nationality – 14,585
 Regional defined – 224
 Unknown – 35,670

Ethnic maps by settlements:

Ethnic maps by municipalities:

Ethnic maps by Republic of Srpska by municipalities:

Ethnic maps of Sarajevo by settlements:

Ethnic maps of Brcko by settlements:

Modern

1992 estimate 
4.4 million people of which:
 Bosniaks 44%
 Serbs 33%
 Croats 17%
 others 6%

Bosnian War 
During the Bosnian War (1992–1995) ethnic cleansing drastically changed the ethnic composition and population distribution in Bosnia and Herzegovina. (See: Casualties of the Bosnian War)

1996 UNHCR census 
In 1996 the UNHCR conducted a detailed population census in the whole country. This census was not only officially considered "official" because the Government of BH refused to recognize it, claiming that its recognition would be the same as the recognition of the ethnic cleansing conducted in the war. It was concluded that Bosnia and Herzegovina had 3,919,953 inhabitants:

Federation 
Totally 2,444,665

Republika Srpska 
Totally 1,475,288

Ethnic (2000 estimate)

2002-2005 population estimates 

3,922,205 (2002)

4,025,476 (July 2005 estimate)

Religious (2008 estimate)

2013 census 
In October 2013, Bosnia conducted its first official census since the Bosnian War.

Agency for Statistics of Bosnia and Herzegovina announced the final census results on July 1, 2016 based on methodology that is disputed by the Republic of Srpska entity, and because of this, doesn't recognize these results as relevant. The European Union welcomed the results of the census and evaluated them as correct and in accordance to EU statistical standards.

Total population: 3,531,159

Ethnic structure 

Ethnic maps of Republika Srpska by municipalities:

Ethnic maps of Sarajevo by settlements:

Ethnic maps of Brcko by settlements:

Linguistic structure 

 Bosnian 1,866,585 (52.9%)
 Serbian 1,086,027 (30.8%)
 Croatian 515,481 (14.5%)
 others: 63,066 (1.8%)

Linguistic maps of Republika Srpska by municipalities:

Religious structure 

 Islam: 1,790,454 (50.7%)
 Orthodoxy: 1,085,760 (30.7%)
 Catholicism: 536,333 (15.2%)
 others: 118,612 (3.4%)

Religious maps of Republika Srpska by municipalities:

See also 
 Bosnia and Herzegovina
 Federation of Bosnia and Herzegovina
 Republika Srpska
 Brčko District
 Herzeg-Bosnia
 History of Bosnia and Herzegovina
 Bosniaks
 Bosnians
 Croats
 Serbs
 History of the Jews in Bosnia and Herzegovina
 Muslims (ethnic group)
 1991 Bosnia and Herzegovina Population Census

Notes

References

External links
 1991 Census in BIH – census data for all municipalities
 1991 Census in BIH – census data for settlements
 Census data
 Serbs of SFRJ
 The Serbs of Bosnia and Herzegovina
 Bosnia and Herzegovina in the Catholic Encyclopedia
 The historical aspect of the Serbian question in the Yugoslav crisis
 Agrarian reform of 1918
 Population of Bosnia and Herzegovina (in Croatian and Bosnian)
 CIA World Fact book – Bosnia and Herzegovina
 Short documentary on Displaced people and refugees in Bosnia and Herzegovina

Geographic history of Bosnia and Herzegovina
Demographics of Bosnia and Herzegovina
Bosnia